Mor Maman may refer to:

Mor Maman (footballer) (born 1986), Israeli defender
Mor Maman (beauty queen) (born 1994), Miss Israel 2014

See also
Maman (disambiguation)